The Calhan School District RJ-1 is a public school district serving in northeastern El Paso County, Colorado as well as parts of southern Elbert County. Serving a relatively small population, the entire educational range of the district, from preschool through twelfth grade, is housed on a single campus, along with all of the administrative functions.

The school (and district) mascot is the bulldog.

List of schools
The Calhan School District RJ-1 divides its grades into three schools, but they are all hosted on the same campus.
Calhan Elementary School
Calhan Middle School
Calhan High School

See also

List of school districts in Colorado

References

External links

Education in El Paso County, Colorado
School districts in Colorado